Magdaline Jepkorir Chemjor (born 12 November 1978) is a Kenyan long-distance runner.

At the 2003 World Cross Country Championships Chemjor finished fifth in the long race, while the Kenyan team, of which Chemjor was a part, won the silver medal in the team competition. She participated in the World Half Marathon Championships in 2001 and 2003. She also won the 2003 Berlin Half Marathon.

Achievements

Personal bests
5000 metres - 16:00.77 min (1999)
Half marathon - 1:09:39 hrs (2003)

References

External links

1978 births
Living people
Kenyan female long-distance runners
Kenyan female cross country runners
Kenyan female marathon runners
21st-century Kenyan women